Kåbdalis is a small locality in Jokkmokk Municipality, Norrbotten County, Sweden, with 91 inhabitants 2005. In the winter many tourists come to the village because of its well-known ski slope.

References 

Populated places in Jokkmokk Municipality
Lapland (Sweden)